The 1913 South Carolina Gamecocks football team represented the University of South Carolina as an independent during the 1913 college football season. Led by second-year head coach Norman B. Edgerton, the Gamecocks compiled a record of  4–3 record.

The Gamecocks employed trick plays to avenged the previous year's loss to Florida, winning 13–0 in a steady rain.

Schedule

References

South Carolina
South Carolina Gamecocks football seasons
South Carolina Gamecocks football